Rajiv Vinaik (born 29 September 1964) is an Indian former first-class cricketer who played for Delhi and Services. After retirement, he worked as a coach with the Delhi District Cricket Association.

Career
Vinayak played as a wicket-keeper batsman in 50 first-class and 22 List A matches. He represented Delhi from 1986/87 to 1992/93, followed by Services for 1993/94 and 1994/95 seasons. He then returned to play for Delhi in 1995/96. He was a member of the Delhi team that won the 1988–89 Ranji Trophy and 1991–92 Ranji Trophy.

After retirement, Vinayak became a cricket coach and worked for Delhi District Cricket Association. He worked as Delhi senior team manager in early-2000s and became the junior team coach in 2005. He became the assistant coach of the Delhi senior team in 2006/07. In 2013, he made a comeback as assistant coach of Delhi.

References

External links 
 
 

1964 births
Living people
Indian cricketers
Delhi cricketers
Services cricketers
North Zone cricketers
Indian cricket coaches